An albino is an organism with the disorder albinism — the congenital lack of normal pigmentation.

Albino may also refer to:

People
 Albino (name)

Places
 Albino, Lombardy, a comune in the Province of Bergamo, Italy
 Albino Rock, an island in Queensland, Australia

Other uses
 Albino (chess), a problem in the game of chess
 Albino (comics), a Marvel Comics supervillain
 Albino (film), a 1976 thriller film distributed by Troma Entertainment
 Spanish colonial term for an octoroon, a person of 1/8 African and 7/8 European ancestry